Rampal Singh (born 1 September 1930, in Village Sikta Siddarthnagar district) is an Indian politician, belonging to Bhartiya Janata Party. In the 1991 election he was elected to the 10th Lok Sabha from the Domariyaganj Lok Sabha constituency of Uttar Pradesh.

He was also member of 12th and 13th Lok Sabha from Domariyaganj.

He is an engineer and agriculturist. He is married to Smt Prabhawati Devi. He has one son, Prem Prakash Singh and resides at Siddharthnagar district .

References

External links
 Lok Sabha Members Bioprofile in Lok Sahba website

India MPs 1991–1996
1930 births
Living people
People from Uttar Pradesh
People from Siddharthnagar district
India MPs 1998–1999
India MPs 1999–2004
Lok Sabha members from Uttar Pradesh
Bharatiya Janata Party politicians from Uttar Pradesh